Corbyville is a community located within the City of Belleville, Ontario. Its origins begin when Henry Corby immigrated to Canada. Corby had been a baker in England and when he arrived in Belleville in 1832, set up a small food shop. After serving in the Rebellion of 1837 he bought a Saint Lawrence steamer named the Queen which he operated for four years.

It was customary for farmers to set aside a portion of their inferior grain to be made into whisky, and as Corby was already making whisky for the locals, he became interested in the distilling process. In 1857, Corby built a dam and established a grist-mill on the bank of the Moira River. In 1859 he built a distillery which became more important than the mill.   ( I am pretty sure this mill was built long before that by Wm Reed and his Son, about 1812, or at least there was another built back then)

Ten years after building his first mill, Henry decided to try his hand at politics and was elected mayor in 1867. The following year he served as a member of the Provincial Parliament for the Conservatives.

Henry died on October 25, 1881 at which time his son, Harry, took over the business. Harry began to sell the whisky by the bottle rather than the barrel, seeing it a better business opportunity. In 1905 the company was named the H. Corby Distillery. The distillery was closed in 1989.

Corbyville today

The hamlet of Corbyville is not really a ghost town as it is sometimes described since there are over 700 households here. Corbyville has an elementary school, Harmony Public School. Teenage students who live in Corbyville are driven by bus into neighbouring city, Belleville, to attend high school.

On Sunday April 5, 2009 most of what remained of the old Corby Distillery burned down. Arson was suspected.

Now Corbyville is home to a local distillery Signal Brewery, which has a constant flow of people attending in hopes to form a get together as well as trying some wood stove baked pizza.

Corbyville is also home to a few small businesses now such as Landtech Design.

Wildlife

Because of its rural location and proximity to woodlands, there is an abundance of wildlife in Corbyville. Wildlife sightings include deer, black bear, raccoons, porcupine, squirrels, fox, rabbits, muskrats, groundhogs and coyotes. There is a wide variety of birds found here including wild turkeys, American woodcocks, pileated woodpeckers, great blue herons, Canada geese and kingfishers. The Moira River, which runs through part of Corbyville, is home to many different species of animals including snapping turtles, crayfish and garter snakes.

References

External links

Ontario Abandoned Places - Corbyville
Ghosttownpix.com - Corbyville
Harmony Public School

Communities in Hastings County